Cardcaptor Sakura: The Movie is a 1999 Japanese anime film directed by Morio Asaka and produced by Madhouse and Bandai Visual. The film is based on the anime television series adaptation of Clamp's Cardcaptor Sakura manga series. Written by Nanase Ohkawa, Clamp's head writer, it was released in Japanese theaters on August 21, 1999. It won the Feature Film Award at the 1999 Animation Kobe. Set between the first and second seasons of the television series, the film follows Sakura Kinomoto and her friends as they travel to Hong Kong and encounter a vengeful spirit who was hurt by Clow Reed in the past. A second film, Cardcaptor Sakura Movie 2: The Sealed Card, was released in 2000.

Plot
Sakura Kinomoto, Cardcaptor of the Clow Cards, successfully seals the Arrow Card with help from her friends Syaoran Li, Kero, Tomoyo Daidoji, and Meiling Li. That night, Sakura experiences a strange dream where two pieces of cloth pull her underwater. After school ends for spring break, Sakura and Tomoyo visit the "Twin Bells" shop where Sakura participates in a lottery to win a vacation to Hong Kong. As Sakura reaches for a lottery ball, one magically flies into her hand, the winning ball for the vacation. Sakura goes with Tomoyo, Kero, her big brother Toya and his best friend Yukito Tsukishiro, who Sakura has a crush on.

As the group tour the city, Sakura experiences the dream again, this time including two malevolent birds and a mysterious woman wearing the floating clothes. During a tour of the Yuen Po Street Bird Garden (also referred to as "Bird Street"), Sakura spots the two birds and pursues them across the city, finding an old water well where the clothes emerge and hypnotize her. As Sakura is drawn towards the well, Syaoran appears and scares the birds away. Reuniting with the others including Meiling, Sakura is taken to the Li family estate, where she meets Syaoran's four eccentric older sisters and his mother, Yelan, a powerful sorceress who senses Sakura is in danger. Staying for the night, Sakura experiences the dream again where the woman attacks her. Yelan takes Sakura outside and warns her that the woman is extremely powerful and is deliberately contacting Sakura. The next day, Syaoran and Meiling are forced to accompany Sakura and the group around Hong Kong to aid them if something should happen.

Sakura spots the birds again and pursues them with Kero. They chase them down to an antique store, where they come across an old book that has a picture of the woman on the cover. Sakura is hypnotised again and opens the book before her friends, flooding the shop and transporting the group to another dimension where the woman dwells. The birds are revealed to be her clothes. The woman, actually a sorceress named Madoushi, attacks Sakura in rage, believing she had summoned Clow Reed, creator of the Clow Cards. Sakura discovers that her friends, except for Syaoran, have been taken prisoner, and Madoushi demands Clow come in exchange for their freedom. Syaoran attempts to distract Madoushi so Sakura can rescue Tomoyo, but is captured as well. Sakura escapes with Kero and Tomoyo back to the antique store, but find the book has vanished. Kero realizes he knows Madoushi, and explains that she was a fortune teller who was unintentionally put out of business by Clow when his predictions turned out to be more accurate than hers. Madoushi challenged him to one fight after another and her hatred bound her to another dimension, but is likely unaware she is a spirit. Sakura realizes the well appeared on the book cover and that it is another entrance to Madoushi's prison.

Sakura goes to the well where she encounters Yelan, who breaks the shield surrounding the well to allow Sakura and Kero to enter. Sakura confronts Madoushi, who uses the magic of Sakura's friends to escape her prison, but is shocked by Hong Kong's modern-day appearance. Sakura and Kero follow, but Madoushi captures Sakura and holds her prisoner. When Sakura tells her of Clow's passing, Madoushi angrily tries to drown Sakura by trapping her in a flooded skyscraper with her clothes. Sakura uses the Arrow Card to escape and she confronts Madoushi, sympathizing with the sorceress and confirms Clow is dead. Madoushi dissolves into water, passing on, but releases Sakura's friends. While Toya and Yukito have no memory of what happened, Sakura tells Tomoyo and Kero they may have to visit Hong Kong again in the future.

Voice cast

Production
The same production staff that produced the anime television series adaptation of Cardcaptor Sakura also produced Cardcaptor Sakura: The Movie. The film was animated by Madhouse, produced by Bandai Visual, directed by Morio Asaka, written by Nanase Ohkawa of Clamp, and featured character designs by Kumiko Takahashi, who based the designs on Clamp's original illustrations. The art director for the film was Katsufumi Hariu, and there were three animation directors: Hitoshi Ueda, Kumiko Takahashi and Kunihiko Sakurai. The music was produced by Takayuki Negishi, with Masafumi Mima as the sound director.

Media releases
Cardcaptor Sakura: The Movie was released on VHS, LD and DVD in Japan by Bandai Visual on February 25, 2000. The film was re-released on November 25, 2000 on VHS, May 25, 2007 on DVD in a two-disc set with Cardcaptor Sakura Movie 2: The Sealed Card, and on December 22, 2009 on DVD. Nelvana released an English dubbed version of the film with Voicebox productions retaining the same name and story changes as its main Cardcaptors dub, although it was dubbed visually uncut and released in both edited and uncut editions. This version first aired on Teletoon in its native Canada on April 6, 2002. As with the television series, Pioneer Entertainment also released the film on home video with the original Japanese audio and English subtitles. Both the edited and unedited versions were released on VHS and DVD on March 26, 2002. Discotek Media released the film on Blu-ray Disc and DVD on September 30, 2014 in North America.  The film was screened in theaters again on January 21, 2017 in Japan to celebrate the 20th anniversary of the manga.

The single containing the song was released on August 11, 1999 by Victor Entertainment. The film's original soundtrack was released on August 25, 1999 by Victor Entertainment containing one disc and 30 tracks.

Notes

References

External links
Cardcaptor Sakura: The Movie at Madhouse 

1999 anime films
1999 fantasy films
Cardcaptor Sakura
1990s children's fantasy films
Japanese fantasy films
Films set in Hong Kong
Shochiku films
Discotek Media
Nelvana films
Japanese animated fantasy films
Japanese fantasy adventure films
Japanese magical girl films